The 2022 LA Galaxy II season was the club's 9th season of existence, and their 9th and last season in the USL Championship. From 2023 onwards the team will compete in the MLS Next Pro.

Squad information

Transfers

Transfers in

Transfers out

Competitions

Friendlies

USL Championship

Standings

Western Conference

Regular season 
The full schedule was released on January 12, 2022. And the kickoff times were announced on January 27, 2022.

All times in Pacific Time Zone.

See also 
 2022 in American soccer
 2022 LA Galaxy season

References

External links 
 

LA Galaxy II seasons
LA Galaxy II
LA Galaxy II
LA Galaxy II